André Cardinal Destouches (sometimes called des Touches) (baptised 6 April 1672  – 7 February 1749) was a French composer best known for the opéra-ballet Les élémens.

Biography 
Born in Paris, the son of Étienne Cardinal, a wealthy merchant, André Cardinal was educated by Jesuits. With the Jesuit Father Guy Tachard, he went on a mission to Siam for two years, leaving in January 1687, and spending some time at the Cape of Good Hope, arriving in Siam in September. Coming back to France, in September 1688, he spent several months at the academy in the Manège royale, rue de Tournon. In 1692 he joined the army and participated in the invasion of Namur, discovering his musical talent while not occupied by combat.  When his father died in August 1694, André Cardinal added "Destouches" to his name in memory of his father's title, Seigneur des Touches et de Guilleville. He quit the army in 1696 to pursue his musical aspirations.

Destouches' opera Issé was performed for Louis XIV at the Trianon in 1697. Louis was impressed and said that he enjoyed his music as much as that of Jean-Baptiste Lully. The opera was successfully repeated at the Opéra a few weeks later. The following year found him dining with Boileau in the company of Racine.

After a series of successful operas and the commencement of his successful collaboration with the librettist Pierre-Charles Roy, in 1713 the king appointed Destouches inspector general of the Académie Royale de Musique, at a stipend of 4000 livres a year; later, in 1725 Louis XV would appoint him superintendent of chamber music for the Chambre du Roi, and then Director of the Académie. Under the Régence, as Destouches' operas were revived at the Opéra, Destouches was able to purchase the terroir of La Vaudoire at Sartrouville, conveniently close to Paris. The young Louis XV danced in Destouches' ballet Les élémens at the Tuileries, 31 December 1721, and the aged Destouches led the musicians for his daughters' masked ball on 13 January 1744. With the beginning of the public Concerts Spirituels in Paris, Destouches performed his De Profundis (1725) and his cantata Sémélé (1728) and motet for large chorus O dulcis Jesu (also 1728); Queen Maria Leszczyńska commanded Destouches to recreate the concert series at the Tuileries. With the death of Michel Richard Delalande in 1726, Destouches assumed control of the Musique du Roi.

In 1724 he married Anne-Antoinette de Reynold de la Ferrière. He was buried in the crypt of Saint-Roch, Paris.

Works
Issé (pastorale héroïque), libretto by Antoine Houdar de la Motte (1697, in five acts 1708)  Issé played at Wolfenbüttel (in German) and The Hague. 
Amadis de Grèce (tragédie en musique), libretto by La Motte (26 March 1699)
Marthésie (tragédie en musique), libretto by La Motte (11 October 1699)
Omphale (tragédie en musique), libretto by La Motte (10 November 1701)
Le carnaval et la folie (comédie-ballet), libretto by La Motte (3 January 1704)
Callirhoé (tragédie en musique), libretto by Pierre-Charles Roy (27 December 1712)
Télémaque (tragédie en musique), libretto by the abbé Simon-Joseph Pellegrin (29 November 1714)
Oenone (cantata), (February 1716)
Sémiramis (tragédie en musique), libretto by Pierre-Charles Roy (4 December 1718) 
Les élémens (opéra-ballet), in collaboration with Delalande, libretto by Roy (1721)
Les stratagèmes de l'amour (ballet), libretto by Roy (26 March 1726)

Discography

 Callirhoé : Cyril Auvity, Stéphanie d'Oustrac, Callirhoé, Cyril Auvity, Agénor, João Fernandes, Corésus, Ingrid Perruche, La Reine,Renaud Delaigue, Le Ministre, Stéphanie Révidat, Une Princesse de Calypso, Une Bergère, Le Concert Spirituel, conducted by Hervé Niquet. 2 CD Glossa 2007.
Les Éléments :  excerpts from the work have been recorded by the Academy of Ancient Music, conducted by Christopher Hogwood, Decca (L'Oiseau-Lyre) 475 9100 (CD). 2008.
 Les Éléments :  excerpts, Ensemble Les Surprises, conducted by L-N Bestion de Camboulas. CD Ambronay 2018
 Issé : Judith van Wanroij, Issé, Chantal Santon-Jeffery, Doris, Eugénie Lefebvre, La première Hespéride, une Nymphe, une Dryade, Mathias Vidal, Apollon (sous les traits du berger Philémon), Thomas Dolié, Hylas, Matthieu Lécroart, Jupiter, Pan,Etienne Bazola, Hercule, le Grand Prêtre, Stéphen Collardelle, un Berger, Le Sommeil, l'OracleLes Chantres du Centre de musique baroque de Versailles, Ensemble Les Surprises, conducted by Louis-Noël Bestion de Camboulas. 2 CD Ambronay éditions 2019. Diapason d’or.
 Sémiramis : Eléonore Pancrazi, Sémiramis, Emmanuelle De Negri, Amestris, Mathias Vidal, Arsane, Thibault de Damas, Zoroastre, David Witczak, L'Oracle, L'Ordonnateur des jeux funèbres, Judith Fa, Babylonienne, Prêtresse, Clément Debieuvre, Babylonien, Génie, Choeur du Concert Spirituel, Les Ombres, conducted by Sylvain Sartre. 2 CD Château de Versailles Spectacles 038. 2021. (The Prologue was not recorded).

Notes

References

External links

 

1672 births
1749 deaths
18th-century classical composers
18th-century French composers
18th-century French male musicians
Directors of the Paris Opera
French composers
French male classical composers
French Baroque composers
French ballet composers
French opera composers
French theatre managers and producers
Male opera composers
Musicians from Paris
17th-century male musicians